A DVD magazine is a magazine that collects most of its content on DVD, or is issued in a  DVD-only format. It was invented by Isak Bini who published the first DVD magazine: City and You DVD magazine. It will play on a regular DVD player.

The content on a DVD magazine can vary with things like Live-action short films, interviews, animated shorts, music videos, trailers, Interactive games, and much more.

Selected list of DVD magazines
City & You DVD Magazine
Aspect Magazine
Wholphin DVD Magazine
The Raw Report DVD-Magazine
Array DVD magazine
Uncut DVD
XXL DVD Magazine (first issue released January 2007 magazine from the publishers of XXL magazine)
Movie FX Magazine (well known for its 4th issue being the only official public DVD release of the original 2002 Spider-Man trailer with the World Trade Center Twin Towers)
Guitar World presents...Guitar DVD
Short Cinema Journal
2012 Aficionado DVD Zine (known as the first zine in DVD format)

Magazines that usually have accompanying DVDs
Total Movie, a magazine that would always include an accompanying bonus full-length film on DVD along with trailers, and short films.
Newtype USA, always came with a DVD of anime episodes.
Official Xbox Magazine
Official U.S. PlayStation Magazine
Young Guitar Magazine, usually comes with a DVD of guitar performances.
Paste, usually includes a CD or DVD or both.

DVD magazines